The Quayside is an area along the banks (quay) of the River Tyne in Newcastle upon Tyne (the north bank) and Gateshead (south bank) in Tyne and Wear, North East England, United Kingdom.

History
The area was once an industrial area and busy commercial dockside serving the area, while the Newcastle side also hosted a regular street market. In recent years the docks became run-down, and the area has since been heavily redeveloped to provide a modern environment for the modern arts, music and culture, as well as new housing developments (e.g. at St Peter's Marina). Along the Newcastle side is an area that houses restaurants, bars and night clubs as well as housing and the Newcastle Law Courts. The NewcastleGateshead initiative now lists the Quayside as a top ten attraction.

The Gateshead side of the river is designated and signposted as Gateshead Quays. It is the site of the BALTIC Centre for Contemporary Art and The Sage Gateshead performing arts and conference centre. Also moored on the Gateshead side from 1984 until 2008 was the Tuxedo Princess (replaced for a time by sister ship Tuxedo Royale), a floating nightclub, beneath the Tyne Bridge near the Sage.

The Sage, an arena and conference centre, is under construction between the Sage Gateshead and the Baltic.

One of the Quayside's main features is the pedestrian Gateshead Millennium Bridge, opened in 2001, which spans the river between the BALTIC Centre for Contemporary Art and the Newcastle Law Courts. The other bridge which allows direct road and pedestrian links between the two banks is the low level Swing Bridge, built in 1876, and located nearer the two respective city centres. Using the two bridges, the Quayside is the venue for the junior course of the annual Great North Run.

Whey Aye

In July 2019, Newcastle City Council passed plans to erect a giant observation wheel on the quayside at Spiller's Wharf as part of a wider ‘Giants on the Quayside’ development.

Buildings
Notable buildings include:
The Customs House, a Grade II listed building built in 1766, altered and refronted in 1833 by Sydney Smirke.
The Malmaison Hotel, a Grade II listed building built in 1900 as a warehouse for the Cooperative Society.
The Newcastle Law Courts, built between 1984 and 1990, designed by Napper Collerton, architects.

Public transport
Go North East's QuayLink Q1, Q2 and Q3 services operate frequently. QuayLink connects most of the main attractions and destinations in NewcastleGateshead, serving those who live, work, study, or those just visiting the area.

References

External links 
 Newcastle Quayside & Gateshead Quays
 Newcastle Tourist Information
 Gateshead Quays
 St Peter's - Newcastle Residential Areas

Districts of Newcastle upon Tyne
Geography of Tyne and Wear
River Tyne
Entertainment districts in the United Kingdom
Tourist attractions in Newcastle upon Tyne